Lily Shayan Nabet (born September 24, 1999) is an American professional soccer player who plays as a midfielder in the National Women's Soccer League (NWSL) for Angel City FC.

Early life
Nabet was born in Tarzana, California to David and Shadi Nabet. She attended Chaminade College Preparatory School and played for Real So Cal, where she qualified for U15 and U16 regionals and scored three goals and one assist in her U18 season. She has two brothers, Amin and Matin.

College career
Nabet attended Duke University, earning a degree in sociology. As a junior in 2019, she started all 20 matches and registered four assists. In her senior year, when she co-captained the team, the Blue Devils made it to the quarterfinals of the NCAA D1 women's soccer tournament. The following year, Nabet opted to use the extra year of eligibility granted by the NCAA due to the COVID-19 pandemic, pursuing a master's degree in business management at the Fuqua School of Business. In 2021, Nabet again co-captained the team, helping to lead them to the quarterfinals of the NCAA D1 women's soccer tournament.

Nabet was named to the 2021 ACC Academic Honor Roll.

Professional career

Club

Angel City FC, 2022–
Angel City FC selected Nabet in the third round of the 2022 NWSL Draft, 36th overall. She made her first appearance for Angel City on June 3, 2022, against the Portland Thorns. She got her first start on July 1, 2022, also against the Thorns. In total, she recorded 205 minutes in 10 matches. In 2022, she led the team in passing accuracy and pressure regains per 90.

Honors

College
ACC Academic Honor Roll: 2021

References

External links

1999 births
Living people
American women's soccer players
Soccer players from California
Soccer players from Los Angeles
People from Los Angeles
Sportspeople from Los Angeles County, California
Women's association football midfielders
Duke Blue Devils women's soccer players
Angel City FC players
National Women's Soccer League players
Angel City FC draft picks